Biswanath Mukherjee (17 April 1915 – 16 October 1991) was an Indian politician and leader of Communist Party of India. He was elected as Member of Legislative Assembly in 1971 from Midnapore Constituency and 1977 and 1982 from Tamluk Constituency.

He started his political career as a student; he was the one of the founder leaders of All India Students' Federation in Bengal. He was the Joint Secretary of AISF. In 1938, students of Calcutta University refused to salute the British flag and restricted by Syama Prasad Mukherjee. He led the huge students' movement to revoke their restriction.

He was married to Geeta Mukherjee on 8 November 1942.

References

Communist Party of India politicians from West Bengal
West Bengal MLAs 1977–1982
West Bengal MLAs 1982–1987
1915 births
1991 deaths